Henry Wolff may refer to:

 Henry Drummond Wolff (1830–1908), British diplomat and politician
 Henry Drummond Wolff (Basingstoke MP) (1899–1982), British politician
 Henry William Wolff (1840–1931), British co-operative activist

See also
 Henry Wolfe (born 1979), American musician and actor
 Henry Wolf (disambiguation)
 Henry Wulff (disambiguation)